One Reality is the second album by American metalcore band, Texas in July. It was released through Equal Vision Records on April 26, 2011. The album was produced by Chris "Zeuss" Harris and is the first release by the band to feature current rhythm guitarist, Chris Davis, as well as their first to be released through Equal Vision.

Track listing

Personnel
Texas In July
Alex Good - Vocals
Christian Royer - Lead guitar
Chris Davis - Rhythm guitar
Ben Witkowski - Bass
Adam Gray - Drums
Production
Produced, Engineered, Mixed & mastered by Chris "Zeuss" Harris
A&R by Daniel Sandshaw
Management by Jeremy Weiss (The CI Companies) & John Daley (Blood Company)
PR by Natalie Bisignano
Booking by Dave Shapiro & JJ Cassiere (The Agency Group)
Artwork by Sol Amstutz (solamstutz.com)

Charts

References

2011 albums
Texas in July albums
Equal Vision Records albums
Nuclear Blast albums
Albums produced by Chris "Zeuss" Harris